North Cleveland is a city within the Houston–The Woodlands–Sugar Land metropolitan area and Liberty County, Texas, United States. The population was 247 at the 2010 census.

Geography

North Cleveland is located in the northeast corner of Liberty County at  (30.354110, –95.091776). It is bordered to the east and south by the city of Cleveland, to the north by San Jacinto County and Sam Houston National Forest, and to the west by the East Fork of the San Jacinto River.

Interstate 69/U.S. Route 59, a four-lane freeway, passes through the southeast corner of North Cleveland as it bypasses the center of Cleveland. I-69/US-59 leads northeast  to Livingston and southwest  to Houston.

Via the San Jacinto River, the North Cleveland area is part of the watershed of Galveston Bay.

Demographics

As of 2010 North Cleveland had a population of 247.  The racial and ethnic composition of the population was 68.4% non-Hispanic white, 1.6% non-Hispanic black, 1.2% non-Hispanic from other races, 3.2% from two or more races and 25.9% Hispanic or Latino.

As of the census of 2000, there were 263 people, 98 households, and 68 families residing in the city. The population density was 136.8 people per square mile (52.9/km). There were 109 housing units at an average density of 56.7 per square mile (21.9/km). The racial makeup of the city was 77.95% White, 5.70% African American, 0.38% Native American, 9.89% from other races, and 6.08% from two or more races. Hispanic or Latino of any race were 26.62% of the population.

There were 98 households, out of which 26.5% had children under the age of 18 living with them, 55.1% were married couples living together, 9.2% had a female householder with no husband present, and 29.6% were non-families. 24.5% of all households were made up of individuals, and 12.2% had someone living alone who was 65 years of age or older. The average household size was 2.68 and the average family size was 3.23.

In the city, the population was spread out, with 22.4% under the age of 18, 10.6% from 18 to 24, 24.3% from 25 to 44, 20.5% from 45 to 64, and 22.1% who were 65 years of age or older. The median age was 41 years. For every 100 females, there were 112.1 males. For every 100 females age 18 and over, there were 104.0 males.

The median income for a household in the city was $29,375, and the median income for a family was $41,250. Males had a median income of $21,250 versus $27,813 for females. The per capita income for the city was $14,216. About 13.6% of families and 16.8% of the population were below the poverty line, including 22.6% of those under the age of eighteen and 15.3% of those 65 or over.

Education
North Cleveland is served by the Cleveland Independent School District.

References

Cities in Texas
Cities in Liberty County, Texas
Greater Houston